Marlon Motlop is an Indigenous Australian  former Australian rules footballer who played with the Port Adelaide Football Club in the AFL. His final season was with Glenelg Football Club in the South Australian National Football League (SANFL) in 2021.

He has been developing a career as a musician since 2020, with the alias MARLON, and performing at WOMADelaide as half of a musical duo known as MRLN x RKM.

He is also involved with his cousin Daniel Motlop's native food business.

Early life and family
Marlon has Aboriginal Australian, with his father a Larrakia man and his mother Kungarakany, as well as Torres Strait Islander (Thursday Island) heritage.

His father insisted that he learn to play the guitar around the same time as developing his footballing career as a junior, and he would write songs with his cousins Daniel, Shannon and Steven, who would also go on to be AFL footballers.

Football career
Originally from Wanderers Football Club in the (Northern Territory Football League (NTFL), Motlop first gained the attention of AFL talent scouts when he won the Allan McLean best-and-fairest medal for the 2006 Division Two NAB AFL Under-16 Championships. Motlop was selected by Port Adelaide in the 2007 AFL Draft using their second pick, the 28th overall.

Motlop debuted against Melbourne Football Club in round 21 of the 2008 AFL season, contributing six kicks and eight handballs to his team's 78-point win. The following week Motlop kicked his first AFL goal and collected 16 disposals in a 76-point victory over North Melbourne Football Club. He did not play another game in 2008, but returned in round 9 of the 2009 AFL season where he had a quiet game, registering four kicks and two handballs in a 55-point loss to the Sydney Swans. Round 11 saw Motlop kick 1 goal and collect 12 kicks and three handballs in a 24-point win over the Fremantle Dockers. In what turned out to be his final AFL match, Motlop did not score in his match against the Western Bulldogs, but did get 16 disposals. While not playing in the AFL, Motlop played with West Adelaide Football Club in the South Australian National Football League (SANFL).
 
He was delisted by Port Adelaide at the end of the 2011 AFL season and moved to WAFL club Swan Districts and the year after played for Peel Thunder to continue his career.

After a 2 year stint in the WAFL, where Motlop played state representative football in 2013 against Victoria and registered 28 disposals, he went back to the SANFL where he continued his career at the North Adelaide Football Club and went on to play 79 league games including representing South Australia in 2015 registering 24 disposals.

During Motlop’s time at NAFC, he came 4th in 2014 in the clubs best and fairest and went on to win the Club Champion in 2015. In 2018 Motlop signed with the Glenelg Football Club, where he has played until the end of the 2021 season.

Music career
During his last year of playing football in the SANFL, Motlop started developing his career as a musician, playing as a band with team-mate Rulla Kelly-Mansell. The duo, as MRLN x RKM, opened for Midnight Oil and Vika and Linda at WOMADelaide in March 2021, along with other First Nations artists. Their performance was well-received and gained a glowing review in Rolling Stone Australia. They released their first single, "Black Swan" in June 2021. The duo also perform as Marlon x Rulla.

Also known as MARLON, Motlop has also performed at the Bass In the Grass Festival and AFL Sir Doug Nicholls Round in front of over 30,000 fans. MARLON released three tracks in 2021, and featured Urthboy's Jangle Bells, with their collaboration track "Balmy Christmas Eve" releasing on 15 December 2021.

Singles

Bush food
Motlop is also involved with his cousin Daniel Motlop's native foods business, Something Wild, located in the Barossa Valley.

References

External links

Australian rules footballers from the Northern Territory
1990 births
Living people
Indigenous Australian players of Australian rules football
Wanderers Football Club players
Port Adelaide Football Club players
Port Adelaide Football Club players (all competitions)
Swan Districts Football Club players
West Adelaide Football Club players
Peel Thunder Football Club players
Glenelg Football Club players
North Adelaide Football Club players
Nightcliff Football Club players